A self-made man is a poor man who becomes successful through hard work.

The phrase may also refer to:
 Self-Made Man (book), an autobiographical book by Norah Vincent
 "Self Made Man" (Terminator: The Sarah Connor Chronicles), an episode of the American television series Terminator: The Sarah Connor Chronicles
 A Self-Made Man (film), a 1922 American silent comedy drama film starring William Russell (American actor)

Music
"Self Made Man", song by Ersel Hickey  B-side of "Bluebirds Over The Mountain"
"Self Made Man", by Morcheeba composed by Skye Edwards from album Blood Like Lemonade 2010 
"Self Made Man", by Howlin Rain composed by Howlin' Rain from album The Russian Wilds  2012
"Self Made Man", by John Hartford composed by John Hartford from Iron Mountain Depot/Radio John 
"Self Made Man", by Montgomery Gentry composed by Jay Knowles & Wynn Varble, from album Tattoos & Scars  1999
"Self Made Man", by Michael Schenker from the album Flying God 2002